Integrated Land and Water Information System (ILWIS) is a geographic information system (GIS) and remote sensing software for both vector and raster processing. Its features include digitizing, editing, analysis and display of data, and production of quality maps. ILWIS was initially developed and distributed by ITC Enschede (International Institute for Geo-Information Science and Earth Observation) in the Netherlands for use by its researchers and students. Since 1 July 2007, it has been released as free software under the terms of the GPL-2.0-only license.
Having been used by many students, teachers and researchers for more than two decades, ILWIS is one of the most user-friendly integrated vector and raster software programmes currently available. ILWIS has some very powerful raster analysis modules, a high-precision and flexible vector and point digitizing module, a variety of very practical tools, as well as a great variety of user guides and training modules all available for downloading. The current version is ILWIS 3.8.6.
Similar to the GRASS GIS in many respects, ILWIS is currently available natively only on Microsoft Windows. However, a Linux Wine manual has been released.

History

In late 1984, ITC was awarded a grant from the Dutch Ministry of Foreign Affairs, which led to developing a geographic information system (GIS) which could be used as a tool for land use planning and watershed management studies. By the end of 1988, a DOS version 1.0 of the Integrated Land and Water Information System (ILWIS) was released. Two years later, ILWIS was made commercial with ITC establishing a worldwide distributors network. ILWIS 2.0 for Windows was released at the end of 1996, and ILWIS 3.0 by mid-2001. On 1 January 2004, ILWIS 3.2 was released as a shareware (one-month trial offer). Since July 1, 2007, ILWIS has been distributed as an open source software under the GPL-2.0-only license.

Release history

Features
ILWIS uses GIS techniques that integrate image processing capabilities, a tabular database and conventional GIS characteristics.
The major features include:

Integrated raster and vector design
On-screen digitizing
Comprehensive set of image processing and remote sensing tools like extensive set of filters, resampling, aggregation, classifications. etc...
Orthophoto, image georeferencing, transformation and mosaicing
Advanced modeling and spatial data analysis
3D visualization with interactive zooming, rotation and panning. "Height" information can be added from multiple types of sources and isn't limited to DEM information.
 Animations of spatial temporal data stacks with the possibility of synchronization between different animations.
Rich map projection and geographic coordinate system library. Optionally custom coordinate systems and on the fly modifications can be added. 
Geostatistical analyses, with Kriging for improved interpolation
Import and export using the GDAL/OGR library
Advanced data management
Stereoscopy tools - To create a stereo pair from two aerial photographs
Transparencies at many levels (whole maps, selections, individual elements or properties)  to combine different data sources in a comprehensive way.
Various interactive diagramming options: Profile, Cross section visualization, Hovmoller diagrams
Interactive value dependent presentation of maps ( stretching, representation)  
Hydrologic Flow Operations
 Surface energy balance operations through the SEBS module
GARtrip import - Map Import allows the import of GARtrip Text files with GPS data
Spatial Multiple Criteria Evaluation (SMCE)
 Space time Cube. Interactive visualization of multiple attribute spatial temporal data. 
 DEM operations including iso line generation
Variable Threshold Computation, to help preparing a threshold map for drainage network extraction
Horton Statistics, to calculate the number of streams, the average stream length, the average area of catchments for Strahler stream orders
Georeference editors

Roadmap
The next major version of Ilwis will be based on the Ilwis NG framework (in development). This framework aims at being a connection hub between various heterogeneous data and processing sources (local-remote). Integrating them in a consistent way and presenting them in a unified to the end users (at both programming and user interface level). The framework will be cross platform (ILWIS is now limited to Windows only) and will be deployable on mobile devices.

See also 

List of GIS software

References

External links

ITC ILWIS site
ILWIS users' website

Free GIS software
Free software programmed in C++
Windows-only free software
Remote sensing software